Lewis Vulliamy (1791–1871) was an English architect who is best known for his work on large houses.  He was born in Pall Mall, London, into a family of clock and watchmakers.  At the age of 16 he was articled to the architect Robert Smirke, and from 1809 he studied at the Royal Academy Schools where he won the silver and gold medals.  In 1818 he was awarded a scholarship from the academy, allowing him to study for four years on the continent where he spent most of the time in Italy.

On his return to England, Vulliamy established his practice in Oxford Street, London. His first commission was for work on Syston Park in Lincolnshire for Sir John Hayford Thorold, Bt.  Following the Church Building Acts of 1818 and 1824, he became involved with the Church Commissioners, designing, with others, a series of churches that have become to be known as Commissioners' churches.  Vulliamy designed at least 14 churches for the Commissioners.  He also designed a variety of public buildings, including a grandstand at Wolverhampton Racecourse, the Lock Hospital in Paddington, new premises for The Law Society in London, and the re-fronting of the premises of the Royal Institution, also in London.

Vulliamy's best known works were on large country and town houses.  In addition to his work on Syston Park, he designed other country houses, including Boothby Hall, Lincolnshire.  His major patron was Robert Stayner Holford, for whom he carried out work on Westonbirt House in Gloucestershire, and also designed his London residence, Dorchester House in Park Lane.  These two houses are considered to be Vulliamy's most important works.  Vulliamy published two works: The Bridge of the SSa. Trinita, over the Arno at Florence (1822), and Examples of ornamental sculpture in architecture (1823).  For several years he suffered from chronic bronchitis, and he died at his home on Clapham Common in 1871.  His estate was valued at about £60,000.

This list contains details on Vulliamy's work on large houses.

Key

Works

See also
List of ecclesiastical works by Lewis Vulliamy
List of miscellaneous works by Lewis Vulliamy

References